Mount Benacantil is a mount (or rather a large hill) that dominates the urban part of Alicante, and is the characteristic image of the city. The mount name appears as  Banu-l-Qatil in the work of Muslim geographer Al-Idrisi in the 12th century, but it is possible that this is an error of transcription (Arab names like "beni" are abundant on the peninsula; the name means "family tree") because it does not make sense in Arabic (it would be "the family of the murderer"). Compared with other names in the Valencian Community, the mount name is more likely to be derived from the word "benna", an Arabic transcription of "pinna", which is "rock" in Latin; combined with the adjective "laqanti", which comes from "Laqant," the Arabic name of the city. Therefore, a half Roman, half Arabic toponym, "Benna Laqanti".

The rock mount is covered by pine trees and bushes on the north side, while on the south side, which overlooks the Mediterranean Sea, there are only rocks. In the intermediate areas there are bushes and grasses that are quite characteristic for the dry Mediterranean climate. 

The mount is famous for the rock formation on its south-western slope, known as la cara del moro ("the moor's face").(view image)  

The medieval fortress of Alicante, the Castle of Santa Bárbara stands on the top of the mount. On the slopes of the mount there are Park Ereta, neighborhoods of Santa Cruz, San Roque, San Anton and Raval Roig, and antique apartments. In recent years it became a botellón place.

Avenida Jaime II, which is a continuation of Avenida de Alfonso el Sabio, crosses the northern foot of the mount, and so does a tunnel of Alicante Tram.

References

Alicante
Mountains of the Valencian Community